Francisco Rotllán Zavala (born January 6, 1970) is a Mexican former footballer who played as a forward. He began his career at Irapuato, moving to Puebla in 1991. He made 15 appearances as Puebla reached the final in the 1991–92 season before losing to León. Rotllán scored 10 times the next season, but played progressively less in the following years. He played his last top-division match with Puebla in 1997.

He was a member of the Mexico under-23 national team in the 1992 Olympics in Barcelona, Spain. Rotllán started all three of Mexico's matches in the Olympics, scoring against Denmark and Ghana.

References

1970 births
Living people
Footballers from Guanajuato
People from Irapuato
Irapuato F.C. footballers
Association football forwards
Olympic footballers of Mexico
Footballers at the 1992 Summer Olympics
Mexican footballers